Spaniards, or Spanish people, are the people of the country of Spain.

Spaniard(s) may also refer to:

Arts and entertainment
 The Spaniard (film), a lost 1925 American silent film
 Spaniards (band), a 1980s Australian band
 "Spaniard", a song by the Boo Radleys from Everything's Alright Forever, 1992
 "The Spaniards", a song by Billy Corgan (recording as William Patrick Corgan) from Ogilala, 2017

Places
 Spaniard's Bay, a town in Newfoundland and Labrador, Canada
 Spaniard's Bay (bay), a bay in Newfoundland and Labrador, Canada
 Spaniard Knob, two elevations in Towns County, Georgia, US

Other uses
 Aciphylla colensoi or Spaniard, a plant of New Zealand
 The Spaniard (foaled 1962), a Thoroughbred gelding racehorse
 Spaniards Inn, a historic pub in London, England, UK

See also
 Spaniards Mount, a house designed by Adrian Gilbert Scott, in Hampstead Garden Suburb, London, UK